The Bleriot-SPAD S.540 was a trainer monoplane aircraft built by SPAD in the early 1930s.

Specifications

References

S.540
Aircraft first flown in 1930
Monoplanes
Single-engined tractor aircraft